Atua are the gods and spirits of the Polynesian peoples such as the Māori or the Hawaiians (see also ); the Polynesian word literally means "power" or "strength" and so the concept is similar to that of mana. Today, it is also used for the monotheistic conception of God. Especially powerful atua included:
 Rongo-mā-Tāne – god of agriculture and peace
 Tāne Mahuta – creator of all living things such as animals, birds and trees
 Tangaroa – god of the sea
 Tūmatauenga – a god of war
 Whiro – god of darkness and evil

In Samoa, where  means "god" in the Samoan language, traditional tattooing was based on the doctrine of tutelary spirits. There is also a district on the island of Upolu in Samoa called Atua.

Atua or gods were also the center of Māori religion. In  Māori belief, there was no such word as "religion" because the natural and supernatural world were one.

In other Austronesian cultures, cognates of atua include the Polynesian aitu, Micronesian aniti, Bunun , Filipino and Tao anito, and Malaysian and Indonesian hantu or antu.

See also 

 Hawaiian religion
 List of Māori deities
 Māori mythology
 Polynesian mythology

References 

Polynesian mythology
Samoan words and phrases
Polynesian deities
Austronesian spirituality
Nature spirits